Becerra v. Empire Health Foundation, For Valley Hospital Medical Center, 597 U. S.  (2022), was a United States Supreme Court case in which the Court clarified which patients hospitals are allowed to be reimbursed by Medicare for treating, and at what rate. In a 5-4 opinion written by Justice Elena Kagan, the Court held that "in calculating the Medicare fraction, individuals “entitled to [Medicare Part A] benefits” are all those qualifying for the program, regardless of whether they receive Medicare payments for part or all of a hospital stay."

Opinion of the Court 
Associate Justice Elena Kagan authored the majority opinion of the Court, which reversed the opinion of the United States Court of Appeals for the Ninth Circuit and remanded the case to that court for further proceedings consistent with the opinion.

References

External links
 
 SCOTUSblog coverage

United States Supreme Court cases
United States Supreme Court cases of the Roberts Court
2022 in United States case law